The Bangladeshi national cricket team toured Sri Lanka in March and April 1986 to play in a Limited Overs International (LOI) competition against the Sri Lankan and Pakistani national cricket teams, which was won by Sri Lanka. Bangladesh were captained by Gazi Ashraf.

References

1986 in Sri Lankan cricket
1986 in Bangladeshi cricket
Bangladeshi cricket tours of Sri Lanka
International cricket competitions from 1985–86 to 1988
Sri Lankan cricket seasons from 1972–73 to 1999–2000